The 2018 Georgetown Hoyas football team represented Georgetown University as a member of the Patriot League during the 2018 NCAA Division I FCS football season. They were led by fifth-year head coach Rob Sgarlata and played their home games at Cooper Field. They finished the season 5–6 and 4–2 in Patriot League play to tie for second place.

Previous season
The Hoyas finished the 2017 season 1–10, 0–6 in Patriot League play to finish in last place.

Preseason

Preseason coaches poll
The Patriot League released their preseason coaches poll on July 26, 2018, with the Hoyas predicted to finish in last place.

Preseason All-Patriot League team
The Hoyas placed two players on the preseason all-Patriot League team.

Defense

Khristian Tate – DL

Special teams

Ahmad Wilson – Non-specialist player

Schedule

Game summaries

at Marist

Campbell

at Dartmouth

Columbia

at Brown

at Fordham

at Lafayette

Lehigh

at Colgate

Bucknell

Holy Cross

References

Georgetown
Georgetown Hoyas football seasons
Georgetown Hoyas football